Paranitocris cyanipennis is a species of beetle in the family Cerambycidae. It was described by Stephan von Breuning in 1950. It is known from the Democratic Republic of the Congo. It contains the varietas Paranitocris cyanipennis var. sericea.

References

Saperdini
Beetles described in 1950
Endemic fauna of the Democratic Republic of the Congo